Morning's Gone is a 2006 novel from Australian author Jon Cleary about Matt Durban, an Australian Labor Party politician who is challenging for his party's leadership.

Cleary originally wanted to write a purely political novel but then developed the character of Carmel, Duban's wife, during the writing of it. The book evolved to become more about the story of their marriage.

References

External links
Morning's Gone at AustLit (subscription required)

2006 Australian novels
HarperCollins books
Novels by Jon Cleary